The European Conference on Information Retrieval (ECIR) is the main 
European research conference for the presentation of new results in the field of information retrieval (IR).
It is organized by the Information Retrieval Specialist Group of the British Computer Society (BCS-IRSG).
      
The event started its life as the Annual Colloquium on Information Retrieval Research in 1978 and was 
held in the UK each year until 1998 when it was hosted in Grenoble, France. Since then the venue has
alternated between the United Kingdom and continental Europe. To mark the metamorphosis
from a small informal colloquium to a major event in the IR research calendar, the 
BCS-IRSG later renamed the event to European Conference on Information Retrieval. In recent years,
ECIR has continued to grow and has become the major European forum for the discussion
of research in the field of Information Retrieval.

Some of the topics dealt with include:
 IR models, techniques, and algorithms
 IR applications
 IR system architectures
 Test and evaluation methods for IR
 Natural Language Processing for IR
 Distributed IR
 Multimedia and cross-media IR

Time and Location

The ECIR is generally held in Spring, near the Easter weekend. A list of locations and planned venues are presented below.

 Dublin, 2023 
 Stavanger, 2022 
 Lucca (online only), 2021
 Lisbon (online only), 2020 

 Cologne, 2019 
 Grenoble, 2018 
 Aberdeen, 2017 
 Padova, Italy, 2016 
 Vienna, Austria, 2015 
 Amsterdam, Netherlands, 2014 
 Moscow, Russia, 2013 
 Barcelona, Spain, 2012 
 Dublin, Ireland, 2011 
 Milton Keynes, 2010 
 Toulouse, 2009 
 Glasgow, 2008 
 Rome, 2007 
 London, 2006 
 Santiago, 2005 
 Sunderland, 2004 
 Pisa, 2003 
 Glasgow, 2002 *
 Darmstadt, 2001* (organized by GMD)
 Cambridge, 2000* (organized by Microsoft Research)
 Glasgow, 1999*
 Grenoble, 1998*
 Aberdeen, 1997*
 Manchester, 1996*
 Crewe, 1995* (organized by Manchester Metropolitan University)
 Drymen, Scotland, 1994* (organized by Strathclyde University)
 Glasgow, 1993* (organized by Strathclyde University)
 Lancaster, 1992*
 Lancaster, 1991*
 Huddersfield, 1990*
 Huddersfield, 1989*
 Huddersfield, 1988*
 Glasgow, 1987*
 Glasgow, 1986*
 Bradford, 1985*
 Bradford, 1984*
 Sheffield, 1983*
 Sheffield, 1982*
 Birmingham, 1981*
 Leeds, 1980*
 Leeds, 1979*

 *as the Annual Colloquium on Information Retrieval Research

External links
 Official page at the website of the British Computer Society

Information retrieval organizations
Computer science conferences